Parapoynx plumbefusalis is a moth in the family Crambidae. It was described by George Hampson in 1917. It is found in Sudan, Uganda, Kenya, Tanzania, Zambia, Zimbabwe, Cameroon, Senegal, Nigeria, Niger, Sierra Leone, Angola, Botswana, Kenya and Madagascar.

The wingspan is 14–17 mm for males and 18–23 mm for females. The forewings are white, suffused with fuscous. There is a small dark fuscous spot in the disc, as well as a blackish discal spot. Adults have been recorded on wing in February and from July to October.

The larvae feed on Nymphoides indica.

References

Acentropinae
Moths described in 1917